David Alexander Riddett BSC (born 25 November 1954) is a prominent English cinematographer mostly known for his work at Aardman Animations.

Early life and education
Riddett was born in Harborough, England. He was brought up in village of Great Bowden. His father, Alec Riddett, was a photographer and artistic manager at Harborough Theatre, hence was Riddett's love for art and cinema. Riddett studied Art in Loughborough College, Communication Design (Film) at Leeds College of Art (Bachelor's Degree) and received Certificate in Radio, Film and Television at University of Bristol.

Career
After finishing University of Bristol Riddett directed some student projects there. Then, in 1983 he and Dave Borthwick opened studio bolexbrothers, producing short films, music promos and TV title sequences. In 1985, still being employed by bolexbrothers, Riddett's talent was noted by Aardman Animations and he joined them as freelance member. Here he notably worked, as Cinematographer, with Nick Park on his acclaimed Creature Comforts short and legendary Wallace & Gromit  series, The Wrong Trousers and A Close Shave. Notably, Riddett quit bolexbrothers after 6 years of working here during production of Creature Comforts. During his early years at Aardman Dave also supplied his camera skills for "Sledgehammer" music video.

In 2000, Riddett  was Senior Director of photography on much-acclaimed Chicken Run, Aardman's first feature production then, and was nominated on BAFTA Awards for his work in special visual effects. In 2005 and 2008 Riddett was Director of Photography for Wallace & Gromit's first feature film and for the short Wallace and Gromit in A Matter of Loaf & Death respectively. DoP on Wallace and Gromit World of Inventions and Wallace and Gromit at the Proms.
In 2015 he was Director of Photography on Shaun the Sheep the Movie. Recent Films include Nick Parks  feature 'Early Man' (2018) and Academy Nominated Robin Robin ( 2021 ) .
Dave Alex was made a full member of the British Society of Cinematographers in 2020.

Personal
Riddett and his wife are living in Bristol, city of Aardman's HQ. They have 2 children, a daughter, Charly and a son, Max.

References

External links

Riddett's Facebook page
Interview with Riddett and Dave Borthwick, 26 October 2001.

1954 births
People from Great Bowden
English cinematographers
English film directors
Aardman Animations people
Living people
Alumni of Leeds Arts University